William Xavier Kienzle (September 11, 1928 – December 28, 2001) was an American priest and later writer.

Early career
Kienzle was born in Detroit Michigan.  Ordained to the priesthood of the Catholic Church in 1954, William X. Kienzle spent twenty years as a parish priest. From 1962-74 he was editor in chief of the archdiocese's newspaper, Michigan Catholic, earning an award from Michigan's Knights of Columbus for general excellence in journalism and a Catholic Press Association acknowledgment for editorial writing.  Kienzle left the priesthood in 1974.

Career after leaving the priesthood
When in 1974, Father William X. Kienzle left the Priesthood, through a process called laicization and reportedly due to the church's refusal to remarry divorcees, he became the Editor in Chief at  MPLS Magazine in Minneapolis. Later, moving to Texas, Kienzle was Director of the Center for Contemplative Studies at the University of Dallas. During this period Kienzle authored 24 crime fiction/mystery novels featuring Father Robert Koesler, a Catholic priest.

In 1978, Kienzle published the first, and best known of the Father Robert Koesler mystery novels The Rosary Murders which was made into a movie in 1987, starring Donald Sutherland as Father Koesler. The Screenplay was co-written by Kienzle with Elmore Leonard and Fred Walton (who also directed the film). The Rosary Murders, like most of Kienzle's mysteries, is set in Detroit, Michigan.

The Cognac Festival du Film Policier in 1988 presented the Audience Award to Director Fred Walton, and a Special Mention Award to Elmore Leonard and Fred Walton for the screenplay and the Dialogs in the 1987 film. In 1980 William X. Kienzle was a National Award Fiction Finalist for The Rosary Murders".

Personal life
After leaving the priesthood, Kienzle married Javan Herman Andrews, a journalist from the Detroit Free Press.  Kienzle died suddenly from a heart attack at age 73 on December 28, 2001 at home in West Bloomfield, Michigan, while preparing for an appointment with his cardiologist.  Javan Kienzle died from metastatic breast cancer on September 30, 2015.

Books in the Father Robert Koesler Series
 The Rosary Murders" (1978)
 Death Wears a Red Hat (1980)
 Mind Over Murder (1981)
 Assault with Intent (1982)
 Shadow of Death (1983)
 Kill and Tell (1984)
 Sudden Death (1985)
 Deathbed (1986)
 Deadline for a Critic (1987)
 Marked for Murder (1988) 
 Eminence (1989)
 Masquerade (1990) 
 Chameleon (1991)
 Body Count (1992)
 Dead Wrong (1993)
 Bishop As Pawn (1994)
 Call No Man Father (1995)
 Requiem for Moses (1996)
 The Man Who Loved God (1997)
 The Greatest Evil (1998)
 No Greater Love (1999) 
 The Sacrifice (1999) 
 Till Death (2000)
 The Gathering (2002)

Other Books
William X. Kienzle's Biography, Judged by Love, was published after William X. Kienzle's death by Javan Herman Andrews Kienzle.

Sources

1928 births
2001 deaths
Clergy from Detroit
20th-century American novelists
21st-century American novelists
American crime fiction writers
American male novelists
University of Dallas faculty
Writers from Detroit
Place of death missing
Laicized Roman Catholic priests
20th-century American male writers
21st-century American male writers
Novelists from Texas
Novelists from Michigan